Cordovan is a rich shade of burgundy and a dark shade of rose.  Cordovan takes its name from the city of Córdoba, Spain, where the production of cordovan leather was first practiced by the Visigoths in the seventh century.  The term cordovan has come to describe the colour of clothingleather in particular; in this sense, the use of cordovan overlaps with that of oxblood.

The first recorded use of cordovan as a colour name in English was in 1925.

See also
 Shades of red
 List of colors

References

Shades of brown
Shades of red